Knut ("Kupper'n") Johannesen (born 6 November 1933) is a former speed skater from Norway.

Biography
Born in Oslo and representing the skating club ASK (Arbeidernes Skøyteklubb – later called Aktiv Skøyteklubb) Johannesen won the World Allround Championships in 1957 and 1964, the European Allround Championships in 1959 and 1960, and won the Norwegian Allround Championships eight times (1955 and 1957–1963). He was Olympic Champion twice – on the 10,000 m at the 1960 Winter Olympics in Squaw Valley and on the 5,000 m at the 1964 Winter Olympics in Innsbruck. He led the Adelskalender for a total of 1,100 days. For his achievements, he received the 1959 Oscar Mathisen Award and was elected Norwegian Sportsperson of the Year in 1960.

Johannesen also set a total of four world records over the course of his career, the most famous of which was his 15:46.6 on the 10,000 m at the 1960 Olympics. The Soviet-Russian skaters Nikolay Shtelbaums and Vladimir Shilykovsky had earlier improved on the equally famous 1952 world record 16.32.6 of Hjalmar Andersen, but his time of 15:46.6, along with Kjell Bäckman's time of 16:14.2 from an earlier pair, was the first officially recognised world record achievement since 1952.

Beside skating, Johannesen worked as a carpenter and later ran a gas station.

Records

World records 
Over the course of his career, Johannesen skated four world records:

Source: SpeedSkatingStats.com

Personal records 
To put these personal records in perspective, the column WR lists the official world records on the dates that Johannesen skated his personal records.

Johannesen has an Adelskalender score of 178.358 points. He held first place on the Adelskalender for a total of 1,100 days during two periods between 1960 and 1964.

References

Notes

Bibliography

 Eng, Trond. All Time International Championships, Complete Results: 1889 – 2002. Askim, Norway: WSSSA-Skøytenytt, 2002.
 Eng, Trond; Gjerde, Arild and Teigen, Magne. Norsk Skøytestatistikk Gjennom Tidene, Menn/Kvinner, 1999 (6. utgave). Askim/Skedsmokorset/Veggli, Norway: WSSSA-Skøytenytt, 1999.
 Eng, Trond; Gjerde, Arild; Teigen, Magne and Teigen, Thorleiv. Norsk Skøytestatistikk Gjennom Tidene, Menn/Kvinner, 2004 (7. utgave). Askim/Skedsmokorset/Veggli/Hokksund, Norway: WSSSA-Skøytenytt, 2004.
 Eng, Trond and Teigen, Magne. Komplette Resultater fra offisielle Norske Mesterskap på skøyter, 1894 – 2005. Askim/Veggli, Norway: WSSSA-Skøytenytt, 2005.
 Johannesen, Knut. Fra Kampen til Squaw Valley. Oslo, Norway: Aschehoug, 1956.
 Johannesen, Knut. På'n igjen. Oslo, Norway: Aschehoug, 1960.
 Teigen, Magne. Komplette Resultater Norske Mesterskap På Skøyter, 1887 – 1989: Menn/Kvinner, Senior/Junior. Veggli, Norway: WSSSA-Skøytenytt, 1989.
 Teigen, Magne. Komplette Resultater Internasjonale Mesterskap 1889 – 1989: Menn/Kvinner, Senior/Junior, allround/sprint. Veggli, Norway: WSSSA-Skøytenytt, 1989.

External links

 Knut Johannesen at SpeedSkatingStats.com
 Personal records from Jakub Majerski's Speedskating Database
 Evert Stenlund's Adelskalender pages
 Historical World Records from the International Skating Union
 National Championships results from Norges Skøyteforbund (the Norwegian Skating Association)

1933 births
Living people
World record setters in speed skating
Norwegian male speed skaters
Olympic speed skaters of Norway
Olympic gold medalists for Norway
Olympic silver medalists for Norway
Olympic bronze medalists for Norway
Speed skaters at the 1956 Winter Olympics
Speed skaters at the 1960 Winter Olympics
Speed skaters at the 1964 Winter Olympics
Sportspeople from Oslo
Olympic medalists in speed skating
Medalists at the 1956 Winter Olympics
Medalists at the 1960 Winter Olympics
Medalists at the 1964 Winter Olympics
World Allround Speed Skating Championships medalists
20th-century Norwegian people